Oestophora granesae is a species of gastropod belonging to the family Trissexodontidae.

The species is found in Spain.

References

Trissexodontidae